The Mouth of the Wolf (original title: La bocca del lupo) is a 2009 biographical drama/documentary film written and directed by Pietro Marcello. It premièred at the 2009 Torino Film Festival in Turin, and won the FIPRESCI Prize for 'Best Film' and the Prize of the City of Torino. In 2010 it appeared at the 60th Berlin International Film Festival where it won the Caligari Film Award and the Teddy Award for 'Best Documentary'.

Synopsis
According to a reporter for Metro, the film "straddles the line between documentary and drama". It follows an Italian man named Vincenzo Motta (also known as Enzo) who is serving a long sentence in a Genoa prison. He meets and falls in love with a transsexual woman named Mary Monaco who promises to wait for Enzo when she gets out of prison. When she is released, Mary finds a home for them to share, but in the meantime, she becomes addicted to heroin.

References

External links
 

2009 films
2009 drama films
Italian LGBT-related films
Italian documentary films
Transgender-related documentary films
Docufiction films
Documentary films about the penal system
Films directed by Pietro Marcello
2009 LGBT-related films
Films about trans women
2000s Italian films